The University of Cambridge was the birthplace of the 'Analytic' School of Philosophy in the early 20th century. The department is located in the Raised Faculty Building on the Sidgwick Site and is part of the Cambridge School of Arts and Humanities. The Faculty achieved the best possible results from The Times 2004 and the QAA Subject Review 2001 (24/24). In the UK as of 2020, it is ranked second by the Guardian, second by the Philosophical Gourmet Report, and fifth by the QS World University Rankings.

History of Philosophy at Cambridge
In 1848 under the direction of William Whewell, two new honour examinations, one in natural sciences (relating to physical science), the other in moral sciences (in the sense of mores or social sciences) were introduced. Moral Sciences was interdisciplinary and included five subjects: moral philosophy, political economy, modern history, general jurisprudence and the laws of England. Moral Sciences was not popular as it did not lead to a degree, and in 1860 no candidates took the examinations.

In 1861 following recommendations made by John Grote and Joseph Mayor, the Senate upgraded the status of Moral Sciences to become a three-year Undergraduate honours course in its own right. The Board of Moral Sciences Studies (a precursor to the Faculty) was also set up. Law became a separate subject and was replaced on the Moral Sciences Tripos by Mental philosophy (psychology).

In 1867 the Board of Moral Sciences Studies recommended that History should also be omitted from the tripos. This was passed by the Council of the Senate, leaving  four subjects: moral philosophy, logic, economics and psychology. At this time, J.N. Keynes and James Ward graduated with honours in Moral Sciences and its reputation grew. The increase in quality and to a lesser extent, in quantity, was assisted by the expansion of the teaching staff assisting the two Moral Sciences professors (Political Economy and Moral Philosophy). From the late 1860s a number of College lecturers in the Moral Sciences were appointed from St. John's, Trinity, Caius, and St. Catharine's who included Henry Sidgwick, Joseph Mayor, John Venn, Thomas Woodhouse Levin, and Alfred Marshall.

Due to the efforts of Alfred Marshall, Economics was also dropped from the Moral Sciences Tripos, becoming a separate subject in 1903. This left a syllabus of analytic philosophy. Although Psychology remained nominally part of the Moral Sciences Tripos until after the Second World War, in practice it was an increasingly separate subject in the early part of the twentieth century.

In the first half of the twentieth century Bertrand Russell, G.E. Moore, and Ludwig Wittgenstein were all at work in Cambridge. They were largely responsible for the rise of modern logic and the methods and results of analytic philosophy. Moral sciences was renamed philosophy in 1970.

Constance Maynard was the first woman to read Moral Sciences at Cambridge, completing her studies in 1875.

Philosophers currently at Cambridge 

The list includes both  and also research-active philosophers who play a significant role in the faculty's intellectual life.

 Arif Ahmed
 Alexander Bird
 Simon Blackburn (emeritus)
 Angela Breitenbach
 Clare Chambers
 Tim Crane
 Raymond Geuss (emeritus)
 Jane Heal (emeritus)
 Richard Holton
 Rae Langton
 John Marenbon
 Alex Oliver
 Onora O'Neill (emeritus)
 Michael Potter
 Huw Price (emeritus)
 Timothy Smiley (emeritus)

Past Cambridge philosophers 

Various philosophers have been Knightbridge Professor of Philosophy. The Knightbridge Chair was founded in 1683 and is one of the oldest established chairs in the university.

Philosophers who either worked or studied in Cambridge—including some Knightbridge Professors—include:

Desiderius Erasmus
Francis Bacon
The Cambridge Platonists, including Ralph Cudworth, Benjamin Whichcote and Henry More
William Whewell
John Grote
Henry Sidgwick
John Neville Keynes
George Frederick Stout
James Ward
J. M. E. McTaggart
Bertrand Russell
 William Ritchie Sorley
G. E. Moore
Ludwig Wittgenstein
Alice Ambrose
Helen Knight
Margaret MacDonald (philosopher)
Margaret Masterman
C. D. Broad
Richard Braithwaite
A. C. Ewing
Frank P. Ramsey
Georg Henrik von Wright
 Susan Stebbing
Casimir Lewy
Jonathan Lear
Iris Murdoch
John Wisdom
Elizabeth Anscombe
Bernard Williams
Amartya Sen
Jonathan Bennett
Judith Jarvis Thomson
Ian Hacking
Roger Scruton
Kwame Anthony Appiah
Alain de Botton
Quassim Cassam
Alfred North Whitehead
Renford Bambrough
Hugh Mellor
Jimmy Altham
Eric Olson 
Dominic Scott
Serena Olsaretti
Hallvard Lillehammer
Susan James
Peter Geach
William MacAskill
David Papineau
A.W. Moore
Arthur Balfour

See also
Cambridge University Moral Sciences Club
Human science

References

External links
 Faculty website

Analytic philosophy
Philosophy, Faculty of
Philosophy departments in the United Kingdom